The 1986 U.S. Pro Tennis Championships was a men's tennis tournament played on outdoor green clay courts at the Longwood Cricket Club in Chestnut Hill, Massachusetts in the United States. The event was part of the Super Series of the 1986 Nabisco Grand Prix circuit. It was the 59th edition of the tournament and was held from July 21 through July 27, 1986. First-seeded Andrés Gómez won the singles title.

Finals

Singles
 Andrés Gómez defeated  Martín Jaite 7–5, 6–4
 It was Gómez' 3rd singles title of the year and the 13th of his career.

Doubles
 Hans Gildemeister /  Andrés Gómez defeated  Dan Cassidy /  Mel Purcell 4–6, 7–5, 6–0

References

External links
 ITF tournament details
 Longwood Cricket Club – list of U.S. Pro Champions

U.S. Pro Tennis Championships
U.S. Pro Championships
U.S. Pro Championships
U.S. Pro Championships
U.S. Pro Championships
Chestnut Hill, Massachusetts
Clay court tennis tournaments
History of Middlesex County, Massachusetts
Sports in Middlesex County, Massachusetts
Tennis tournaments in Massachusetts
Tourist attractions in Middlesex County, Massachusetts